The 1908 Republican National Convention was held in Chicago Coliseum, Chicago, Illinois on June 16 to June 19, 1908. It convened to nominate successors to President Theodore Roosevelt and Vice President Charles W. Fairbanks.

U.S. Secretary of War William H. Taft of Ohio won Roosevelt's endorsement and received the presidential nomination. The convention nominated New York Representative James S. Sherman to be his vice presidential running mate.

The Platform 
The Republican platform celebrated the Roosevelt administration's economic policies such as the keeping of the protective tariff, establishment of a permanent currency system (the Federal Reserve), additional government supervision and control over trusts. It championed enforcement of railroad rate laws, giving the Interstate Commerce Commission authority to investigate interstate railroads, and reduction of work hours for railroad workers, as well as general reduction in the work week.

In foreign policy, it supported a buildup of the armed forces, protection of American citizens abroad, extension of foreign commerce, vigorous arbitration and the Hague treaties, a revival of the U.S. Merchant Marine, support of war veterans, self-government for Cuba and the Philippines with citizenship for residents of Puerto Rico.

In other areas, it advocated court reform, creation of a federal Bureau of Mines and Mining, extension of rural mail delivery, environmental conservation, upholding of the rights of African-Americans and the civil service, and greater efficiency in national public health agencies.

The platform lastly expressed pride in U.S. involvement in the building of the Panama Canal, the admission of the New Mexico and Arizona Territories; called for the celebration of the birthday of Abraham Lincoln; and generally deplored the Democratic Party while celebrating the policies of the Republicans. The platform explained the differences between democracy and republicanism in which the Republicans made clear that democracy was leaning towards socialism and republicanism towards individualism.

Speakers 

The following individuals spoke at the 1908 Republican National Convention. Many spoke with the goal of nominating a specific nominee as this was before the age of the primary and the nominees were all decided at the convention.

June 16 
 Prayer by Rt. Rev. P.J. Muldoon V.G.
 Julius C. Burrows, Michigan Senator

June 17 
 Prayer by Rev. William Otis Waters
 Henry Cabot Lodge, Massachusetts Senator

June 18 
 Prayer by Rev. Dr. John Wesley Hill
 George Henry Williams, Former Attorney General
 Henry Sherman Boutell of Illinois, Lawyer and diplomat
 Joseph W. Fordney, Congressman of Michigan
 Frank Hanly, Governor of Indiana
 Charles A. Bookwalter, Mayor of Indianapolis
 Stewart L. Woodford, Former Congressman and Judge of New York
 Theodore E. Burton, Congressman of Ohio
 George A. Knight, Attorney and Businessman
 C.B. M'Coy, Ohio Factory Owner
 W.O. Emory, Young Black Delegate from Macon, Georgia
 Robert S. Murphy, Lieutenant Governor of Pennsylvania
 James Scarlet, Prominent Attorney from Danville, Pennsylvania
 Henry F. Cochems, Wisconsin Football Star
 Charles A.A. McGee, Author of "The Truth About Money" from Wisconsin

June 19 
 Prayer by Rabbi Tobias Schanfarber
 Timothy L. Woodruff, Businessman and Former Politician
 Joseph Gurney Cannon, Speaker of the House
 Augustus E. Willson, Governor of Kentucky
 Henry Cabot Lodge (again)
 Chase Osborn of Michigan
 James Brownlow Yellowley, Mississippi State Legislator
 Thomas N. McCarter, Former Attorney General of New Jersey and public servant
 William Warner, Senator from Missouri
 Julius C. Burrows of Michigan

Presidential nomination

Presidential candidates 

Prior to the convention, Vice President Charles Fairbanks and New York Governor Charles Evans Hughes both seemed like plausible nominees, but Roosevelt was determined to pick his own successor. Though Roosevelt preferred Secretary of State Elihu Root, Root's age and background in corporate law made him an unpalatable nominee, so Roosevelt instead supported Secretary of War William Howard Taft. Entering the convention, Taft, buoyed by the support of the popular Roosevelt, was virtually assured of the nomination. Taft won the presidential nomination on the first ballot, overcoming Fairbanks and the other candidates.

Withdrew Before Convention

Declined to Seek Nomination 

Presidential Balloting / 3rd Day of Convention (June 18, 1908)

Vice Presidential nomination

Vice Presidential candidates 

Taft preferred a progressive running mate such as Indiana Senator Albert Beveridge or Iowa Senator Jonathan Dolliver, but Representative James S. Sherman of New York had the support of Speaker Joseph Gurney Cannon and the New York delegation. Sherman was a fairly conservative Republican who was nonetheless acceptable to the more progressive wing of the party. Sherman won the vice presidential nomination on the first ballot, taking 816 of the 979 votes cast. Former New Jersey Governor Franklin Murphy received 77 votes while Massachusetts Governor Curtis Guild, Jr. received 75 votes, with the remaining votes going to Governor George L. Sheldon of Nebraska and Vice President Charles Fairbanks.

Declined to Seek Nomination 

Vice Presidential Balloting / 4th Day of Convention (June 19, 1908)

See also 
 History of the United States Republican Party
 List of Republican National Conventions
 United States presidential nominating convention
 1908 United States presidential election
 1908 Democratic National Convention

References

External links 
 Republican Party platform of 1908 at The American Presidency Project
 Taft acceptance speech at The American Presidency Project

1908 United States presidential election
Political conventions in Chicago
Republican National Conventions
1908 in Illinois
1908 conferences
June 1908 events